Meyers–Diver's Airport is located in Tecumseh, Michigan, United States. It is owned by Al Meyers Airport, Inc. and managed by Andy Alto.

It has an FAA identifier of 3TE. It is at an elevation of 815 feet. It has two runways; one with an asphalt surface and a length of 2,660 feet and the other with a  turf surface and a length of 1,820 feet. The airport is a  skydiving drop zone.

In the early 1950s the airport was the location of the Meyers Aircraft Company, where the Meyers MAC-145 was produced. The airport was formerly named the Al Meyers Airport, after the founder of Meyers Aircraft Co.

References

External links

 Skydive Tecumseh

Airports in Michigan
Airports in Lenawee County, Michigan
Tecumseh, Michigan